Kynurenine/alpha-aminoadipate aminotransferase, mitochondrial, also known as alpha-aminoadipate aminotransferase and kynurenine aminotransferase 2, is a mitochondrial enzyme that in humans is encoded by the AADAT gene. It converts alpha-aminoadipate to alpha-ketoadipate. It is also one of the Kynurenine—oxoglutarate transaminases.

References

External links 
 
 PDBe-KB provides an overview of all the structure information available in the PDB for Human Kynurenine/alpha-aminoadipate aminotransferase, mitochondrial (AADAT)